"Belleville Rendez-vous" is a song from the animated film Les Triplettes de Belleville (2003), with music by Benoît Charest and lyrics by Sylvain Chomet.  The song was performed "in character" in the film by Béatrice Bonifassi.  The soundtrack album includes two versions of the song, one in French and the other in English, both performed by - M - (a.k.a. Matthieu Chedid). It was nominated for an Oscar for Best Song, and has been subsequently covered  by the male duo The Lost Fingers and the female trio Rock Paper Scissors. Another version of the song entitled "maquette" or "demo" was also included in the soundtrack and sung by Béatrice Bonifassi who also provided the singing voice of the triplettes.

The music video, which comes in French and English versions, shows - M - visiting a psychiatrist. As he tells his troubles in song, ghosts, having heads resembling his, start appearing and dancing on screen. The mental troubles of - M - begin to take their toll as he stands and dances wildly to the dance of the ghosts, much to the fear of the psychiatrist who slowly walks to keep distance. The music video ends with - M - being grabbed by medical personnel with one of them tranquilizing him before they take him away.

Belleville Rendez-vous is also the name given to the film Les Triplettes de Belleville in its UK release.

Animated series theme songs
Film theme songs
French songs
French-language songs
2003 songs